Ștefănești is a small town in Botoșani County, Western Moldavia, Romania. It administers four nearby villages: Bădiuți, Bobulești, Stânca and Ștefănești-Sat.

The town is located near the point where the Bașeu River discharges into the Prut River, on the shore of the Stânca-Costești reservoir. Stânca is a border checkpoint with Moldova, connected via the Stânca-Costești Dam to the town of Costești, Moldova.

Demographics
According to the census from 2011 there was a total population of 5,092 people living in this town. Of this population, 90.57% are ethnic Romanians, 9.3% ethnic Romani.

Natives
The painter Ștefan Luchian (1868–1916) was born here, as well as Vlad Onicescu, the father of the mathematician Octav Onicescu (1892–1983). The town is also the birthplace of the Shtefanesht Hasidic dynasty and as such its name is still known in present-day Israel.

References

Populated places in Botoșani County
Localities in Western Moldavia
Towns in Romania
Moldova–Romania border crossings
Populated places on the Prut
Jewish communities in Romania